"One of Us" is a song by Swedish pop group ABBA. It was released in December 1981 as the lead single from the band's eighth studio album, The Visitors (1981).

Background and release
"One of Us"—which had the working titles "Number 1" and "Mio Amore"—was one of the last songs recorded for ABBA's 1981 album The Visitors, and features a lead vocal by Agnetha Fältskog. It was one of a number of tracks that explored the darker territory of Björn Ulvaeus and Benny Andersson's songwriting, as the two men's divorces were beginning to influence their musical output. The message of the song is about a woman trying to revive a relationship she had ended. Despite misgivings on the part of manager Stig Anderson, and its somewhat depressing lyric, "One of Us" was released as the first single from The Visitors, coupled with the non-album track "Should I Laugh or Cry". Ulvaeus had favored releasing it as the first single from the new album, and the majority of the record companies agreed with him; it proved a wise move, as it would become ABBA's final No. 1 single of their career. The decision to release "One of Us" as a single was made so late that it did not become available in Swedish shops until after The Visitors had been released.

In the United Kingdom, "One of Us" was issued in a different sleeve. Whereas the sleeve used in most countries repeated the album cover photo, Epic Records wanted a different image for the British release and used separate photos of the group members together with a large ABBA logo. Agnetha and Frida appeared on the front cover, with Björn and Benny on the back. The photos were actually out-of-date, as Frida was depicted still with her frizzy perm, while Björn was beardless. A limited-edition picture disc using very similar artwork was also issued.

Cash Box reviewed the single, saying that "a strong but subtle orchestration provides the backdrop for Agnetha Faltskog’s vocals, with a cadre of mandolins adding a romantic flourish".

The B-side, "Should I Laugh or Cry", included a spoken count-in (in Swedish) from Benny. This count-in appeared on the British and South African releases, but not internationally. The master tapes supplied to Epic contained the error, but were not picked up in time, and so appeared on the single release. In the early 2000s, Epic's rights to ABBA's music in the UK had long since expired; however, they still owned all the UK master tapes for the singles. These were then returned to Polar Music (itself owned by Universal Music) in Stockholm, who later issued the error count-in version as a "rarity" on The Complete Studio Recordings box-set, thereby making it available to a worldwide audience (and on CD for the first time). This count-in version is also available on the special "Deluxe Edition" of The Visitors (released on 23 April 2012).

Reception
"One of Us" was the first official single release after both couples within the band had divorced. It would become ABBA's last major hit for 40 years, and the last No. 1 single of their career. It topped the charts in Belgium, West Germany, Ireland and the Netherlands, and was also ABBA's 13th and final No. 1 on the Eurochart. "One of Us" proved a successful hit in Austria, Norway, South Africa, Spain and Switzerland, reaching the Top 10 in all of these countries.

In the United Kingdom, "One of Us" debuted at No. 11 on the singles chart on 6 December 1981 and peaked at No. 3 the following week, where it stayed for three weeks; it remained in the chart for 10 weeks. Upon exiting the Top 10 of the chart on 16 January 1982, "One of Us" would mark ABBA's final appearance in the UK Top 10 for 39 years. It was awarded a gold disc for sales of 500,000 in the UK. As of September 2021, it is ABBA's 15th-biggest song in the UK, including both pure sales and digital streams.

"One of Us" was not released as a single in the United States until February 1983, and proved to be ABBA's worst-ever performing charting song in that territory, reaching a high of No. 107, though this came more than a year after its release elsewhere and ABBA had disbanded by that time.

Music video
In November 1981, a music video for "One of Us" was filmed, directed by Lasse Hallström. It sees Agnetha Fältskog playing a woman who is moving into a new house. She decorates the room by adding furniture and coloring the walls. This is interspersed with individual shots of the ABBA members in a studio standing against a wall of mirrors.

Personnel
 Agnetha Fältskog – lead vocals
 Anni-Frid Lyngstad – backing vocals
 Björn Ulvaeus – guitar, mandolin
 Lasse Wellander – guitar, mandolin
 Benny Andersson – keyboards, synthesizer
 Rutger Gunnarsson – bass, mandolin
 Ola Brunkert – drums

Charts

Weekly charts

Year-end charts

Pandora's version

In June 1995 Swedish Eurodance singer Pandora released a cover version of the song. The track was included on the Japanese edition of her second studio album, Tell the World (1995). The song peaked at No. 13 in Sweden, and reached the top spot in Finland.

Charts

Weekly charts

Year-end charts

See also
 List of number-one singles of 1995 (Finland)

A-Teens version
The A-Teens released a version on their debut album The ABBA Generation in 1999.

As an attempt to promote the A-Teens a bit more, Universal Music Group released a one-track promo single of "One of Us" on radio in late 1999. The song was promoted in Scandinavia, Mexico, Chile, Argentina and Japan.

A special music video was filmed for a TV special in Sweden. It was not used as an official video. It shows parts of shows in Sweden and behind-the-scenes footage of the band having fun, waiting in a room at Stockholm Records' building.

Mamma Mia! Here We Go Again version
"One of Us" was released on 13 July 2018, alongside the soundtrack of Mamma Mia! Here We Go Again, by Capitol and Polydor Records. The song is performed by Amanda Seyfried (Sophie) and Dominic Cooper (Sky) and it was produced by Benny Andersson.

Charts and Certifications

Cher version

"One of Us" was chosen as the third single from Cher's 2018 ABBA tribute album Dancing Queen, released by Warner Bros. Records on 28 September 2018. The track was digitally released on 21 September 2018, at each country's individual midnight time.

Critical reception
Marc Snetiker from Entertainment Weekly gave the album a favourable review, calling it Cher's "most significant release since 1998’s Believe" and saying that "the album ender, 'One of Us,' is frankly one of Cher’s best recordings in years." Billboard also noted that "while the original song is filled with funky melodies and rhythms to mix up the depressing lyrics, Cher trades them in for a piano and a few violins, making the already-melancholy song a bonafide heart-wrencher." Writing for Rolling Stone, Brittany Spanos felt that ""One of Us" in particular sees the biggest musical shift of any of the songs; the original is a breezy, tropical, mid-tempo pop moment that almost disguises the sadness of the lyrics. But that sadness can never hide from Cher, who strips it down to strings, piano and vocals, making sure you can feel every bit of the ego-shedding on the track."

Music video
On the same day as its release, an animated video of a blue vinyl's B-side playing along with the song was released on Cher's YouTube channel. The vinyl represents the Dancing Queen album while the B-side contains the songs "Mamma Mia", "Chiquitita", "Fernando", "The Winner Takes It All" and "One of Us".

Live performances
Cher tweeted that after one of the shows of her Here We Go Again Tour she went into empty arena and sang "One of Us", claiming that it was "not ready....but it was pretty good" and that she was "working on it".

Track listings and formats

Digital download
 "One of Us" – 3:53

Credits and personnel
Credits for Dancing Queen adapted from AllMusic.

Management
 Published by Universal Songs of PolyGramInt., Inc. (ASCAP) and EMI Waterford Music Inc. (ASCAP)
 Recorded by Mark Taylor and Paul Meehan at Metrophonic Studios, London
 Mixed at by Matt Furmidge and Mark Taylor at Metrophonic Studios, London
 Mastered by Sthephen Marcussen Mastering, Hollywood, CA

Personnel
 Cher – primary vocals
 Benny Andersson – songwriter
 Björn Ulvaeus – songwriter
 Ash Soan – drums
 Adam Phillips – guitars
 Hayley Sanderson – backing vocals
 Andy Caine – backing vocals

Other cover versions
In 1982 schlager singer Marianne Rosenberg recorded the song, with lyrics in German, as "Ich sah deine Tränen" ("I saw your tears"). This version peaked at No. 66 on the singles chart in the former West Germany that year.

Other uses
 The song appears in Guardians of the Galaxy: The Telltale Series.
 "One of Us" serves as the theme song for Time Crisis with Ezra Koenig, a radio show that airs on Beats 1.

References

Songs about heartache
Songs about parting
1981 singles
1995 singles
2018 singles
ABBA songs
Pandora (singer) songs
A-Teens songs
Cher songs
Number-one singles in Belgium
European Hot 100 Singles number-one singles
Number-one singles in Germany
Irish Singles Chart number-one singles
Dutch Top 40 number-one singles
Songs written by Benny Andersson and Björn Ulvaeus
Polar Music singles
Music videos directed by Lasse Hallström
1981 songs